The 2022–23 Kent State Golden Flashes men's basketball team represents Kent State University in the 2022–23 NCAA Division I men's basketball season. The Golden Flashes, led by 12th-year head coach Rob Senderoff, play their home games at the Memorial Athletic and Convocation Center, also known as the MAC Center, in Kent, Ohio as members of the Mid-American Conference (MAC). As the second seed they defeated Northern Illinois, Akron, and top seeded Toledo to win the MAC tournament. Kent State was placed as the 13th seed in the Midwest Regional where they lost to Indiana in the first round of the NCAA Tournament.

Previous season

The Golden Flashes finished the 2021–22 season 23–11 overall, 16–4 in MAC Play to finish in second place in the conference. They lost to Akron in the final of the MAC tournament.

Offseason

Departures

Incoming transfers

Recruiting class

Roster

Schedule and results

|-
!colspan=9 style=|Non-conference regular season

|-
!colspan=9 style=| MAC regular season

|-
!colspan=9 style=| MAC tournament

|-
!colspan=9 style=| NCAA Tournament

Source

References

Kent State Golden Flashes men's basketball seasons
Kent State
Kent State Golden Flashes men's basketball
Kent State Golden Flashes men's basketball
Kent State